Appaloosa Interactive (formerly Novotrade International) was a corporation, founded in 1982 in Hungary, that produced video games, computer programs and television commercials during the 1980s and 1990s.

History
Novotrade International was founded by Andras Csaszar and Stephen J. Friedman. Csaszar served as the company's president, while Friedman served as chief executive officer. Novotrade began operating branches in the United States in 1989, and was renamed Appaloosa Interactive (after the horse breed of the same name) in November 1996. That month, the company unveiled its 10-month-old Internet technologies division, Appaloosa Online. The company's headquarters were in Mountain View, California. Appaloosa was the parent company and owner of two software development companies in Budapest, Hungary. Appaloosa was known for its Ecco the Dolphin game series for Sega. Appaloosa also developed two Contra games on the PlayStation and Sega Saturn for Konami.

Appaloosa had 100 employees as of January 2001, and had produced over 150 video games up to that point, many of which were released in Europe. At that time, Friedman said, "In all the years we have been in business, we have only failed to complete a project because of our own inability once or twice." Appaloosa's final game was Jaws Unleashed, released in 2006, and based on the Jaws series of films. The company ceased operations in 2006.

Games
The Adventures of Batman and Robin (Game Gear)
Alternative World Games
Around The World In 80 Days
California Games (Mega Drive/Genesis)
California Pro Golf
Castlevania (Amiga)
Catch a Thief
Circus Games
Contra: Legacy of War (PlayStation, Sega Saturn)
The Contra Adventure (PlayStation)
Cyborg Justice (Mega Drive/Genesis)
Ecco the Dolphin (Mega Drive/Genesis, Mega CD/Sega CD, Master System, Game Gear)
Ecco: The Tides of Time (Mega Drive/Genesis, Mega CD/Sega CD, Game Gear)
Ecco Jr. (Mega Drive/Genesis)
Ecco the Dolphin: Defender of the Future (Dreamcast, PlayStation 2)
Exosquad (Mega Drive/Genesis)
Galaxy Force II (Sega Saturn)
Garfield: Caught in the Act (Game Gear)
Golf Construction Set
Grossology
Holyfield Boxing
How Things Work in Busytown
Impossible Mission II (Amiga, Amstrad CPC, Apple II, Atari ST, Commodore 64, PC MS-DOS, ZX Spectrum, NES)
The Jungle Book
Jaws Unleashed (PlayStation 2, Xbox, PC Windows)
Karateka
King's Quest V: Absence Makes the Heart Go Yonder! (NES)
Kolibri (32X)
The Magic School Bus: Space Exploration Game (Mega Drive/Genesis)
Museum Madness
Peter Pan: A Story Painting Adventure (MS-DOS)
Power Rangers Jigsaw Puzzles
Power Rangers PowerActive Math
Power Rangers PowerActive Words
Power Rangers Print Kit
R.B.I. Baseball 2
Richard Scarry's Busytown (MS-DOS, Mega Drive/Genesis)
Qix (NES)
Sentinel Worlds I: Future Magic
Sky Target (Sega Saturn, Windows)
South Park (PlayStation)
Starship Andromeda
Star Trek: Deep Space Nine – Crossroads of Time (Mega Drive/Genesis, Super NES)
Sub Battle Simulator
Super Action Football
Tails and the Music Maker (Pico)
The Busy World of Busytown
The Lost World: Jurassic Park (Mega Drive/Genesis)
The Lost World: Jurassic Park (Sega Saturn)
The Simpsons: Arcade Game (Commodore 64, MS-DOS)
Three Dirty Dwarves (Sega Saturn, Windows)
Tiny Tank (PlayStation)
Tiny Toon Adventures Cartoon Workshop (NES)
Tomcat Alley (Windows)
USS Stinger (MS-DOS)
Wacky Races (Windows, PlayStation)
Water Polo
Wild West
Wilson Pro Staff Golf
World Karate Championship
World Trophy Soccer (Mega Drive/Genesis)

Unreleased
Airball (NES, unreleased)
Bloodliners (Mega Drive/Genesis, unreleased)

References

External links

Homepage (archived)

Video game companies established in 1982
Defunct video game companies of Hungary
Defunct video game companies of the United States
Companies based in Mountain View, California
Hungarian companies established in 1982